Fabio Taborre (5 June 1985 – 12 September 2021) was an Italian professional road cyclist, suspended from the sport due to an anti-doping violation.

Doping
On 27 July 2015, UCI announced that Taborre had tested positive for the HIF prolyl-hydroxylase inhibitor FG-4592 in an out-of-competition control 16 June 2015, and that he was provisionally suspended. It was announced on 25 May 2016 that Taborre would be suspended for four years for the latter infraction, backdated to 26 July 2015.

Major results

2008
 1st Trofeo Salvatore Morucci
2009
 2nd Giro della Provincia di Reggio Calabria
 9th Memorial Marco Pantani
2010
 9th Gran Premio Nobili Rubinetterie – Coppa Città di Stresa
2011
 1st Gran Premio Città di Camaiore
 1st Memorial Marco Pantani
 4th Trofeo Laigueglia
 4th Trofeo Matteotti
 6th Gran Premio Bruno Beghelli
 7th Giro della Romagna
 9th Gran Premio Industria e Commercio di Prato
 10th Trofeo Melinda
2012
 1st Stage 5 Tour of Austria
 2nd GP Industria & Artigianato di Larciano
 3rd Trofeo Matteotti
 4th Gran Premio Nobili Rubinetterie
 6th Coppa Ugo Agostoni
 6th Milano–Torino
 8th Memorial Marco Pantani
2013
 7th Trofeo Matteotti
 10th Overall Settimana Internazionale di Coppi e Bartali
2014
 9th Giro dell'Appennino

See also
List of doping cases in cycling

References

External links

Fabio Taborre's profile on Cycling Base 

1985 births
2021 deaths
Italian male cyclists
Sportspeople from Pescara
Cyclists from Abruzzo
Doping cases in cycling
Italian sportspeople in doping cases